The UAE Super Cup, is the curtain raiser of the United Arab Emirates football season. It is played between the previous season's Pro-League winners and President's Cup Winners. The first edition was played on 14 September 2008.

History
From 2008 to 2021, it was known as the Etisalat Super Cup and Arabian Gulf Super Cup for sponsorship reasons.

Winners

Notes
1. Edition 1995, 1996 played as league system.
2. Edition 2002, 2003 played as four-team format.

Titles by team
Source:

Notes
1. Al Shabab and Dubai CSC merged into Al-Ahli form Shabab Al Ahli in 2017
2. Al Shaab dissolved in 2017

References

External links
 Official website 
 Fixtures & Results at Goalzz.com

 
Super Sup
National association football supercups
Recurring sporting events established in 2008
2008 establishments in the United Arab Emirates